Off to See the Wizard is an American television anthology series, partially animated but mostly live action, produced by MGM Animation/Visual Arts and telecast on ABC-TV between 1967 and 1968 that was narrated by Hal Holbrook.

History
The series derived its name from the well-known song "We're Off to See the Wizard", featured in MGM's classic 1939 film The Wizard of Oz. Such was the popularity of the film among TV audiences by then that ABC decided to build an anthology series around it, a series which primarily showcased the first network telecasts of some of MGM's most popular recent live-action family films, much as Walt Disney had often showcased the first telecasts of his films on the Disney anthology television series. Animated versions of Dorothy Gale, Toto, the Scarecrow, the Tin Woodman, the Cowardly Lion, and the Wizard of Oz book-ended each episode of the series, often providing humorous introductions to the films. Chuck Jones, who provided the animation, served as executive producer.

Two never-aired episodes consisted of a feature entitled High Jungle, which was scrapped after actor Eric Fleming lost his life during filming.

The series also used music from the famous MGM film. The opening credits featured an unseen chorus singing a stanza of "Over the Rainbow" and segued into Dorothy and her three friends singing "We're Off to See the Wizard."

Featured films
The series ran only an hour, so full-length films had to be split into two parts, much as Disney used to do on its television anthology series. Film shown on the series in order of appearance include:

 Clarence, the Cross-Eyed Lion (1965)
 Flipper (1963)
 Alexander The Great filmed in 1963 with William Shatner, John Cassavetes and Adam West but never previously shown. Directed by Phil Karlson
 Hell Cats (a 1964 television pilot starring George Hamilton)
 Island of the Lost
 Lili (1953)
 Mike and the Mermaid (pilot)
 Rhino!
 The Adventures of Huckleberry Finn (1960)
 Gypsy Colt (1953)
 Untamed World
 Who's Afraid of Mother Goose?
 Wild World
 Zebra in the Kitchen (1965)
 The Glass Slipper (1955)
 Captain Sindbad (1963)

Cast
 Mel Blanc - Cowardly Lion
 Daws Butler - Scarecrow, Wizard of Oz
 Don Messick - Toto, Tin Man
 June Foray - Dorothy Gale, Wicked Witch of the West

See also
 The Wizard of Oz (1939 film)
 Walt Disney anthology television series

References

External links
 

1960s American animated television series
1960s American anthology television series
1967 American television series debuts
1968 American television series endings
American Broadcasting Company original programming
American children's animated anthology television series
American children's animated fantasy television series
American television series with live action and animation
Animated television series based on The Wizard of Oz
Television series by MGM Television
Wizards in television
MGM Animation/Visual Arts